Wayne Benjamin Nunnely (March 29, 1952 – February 16, 2021) was an American football coach. He served as the head football coach at the University of Nevada, Las Vegas (UNLV) from 1986 to 1989. He was later an assistant coach in the National Football League (NFL) with the New Orleans Saints, San Diego Chargers and Denver Broncos. Nunnely died on February 16, 2021.

Playing career
Nunnely played high school football at Monrovia High School in Monrovia, California. Nunnely played college football at the University of Nevada, Las Vegas (UNLV) where he was a fullback.

Coaching career
On April 23, 1986, Nunnely was named interim head coach at UNLV after Harvey Hyde was dismissed due to disciplinary issues surrounding his players. Nunnely had been an assistant coach on Hyde's staff.

Head coaching record

References

Place of death missing
1952 births
2021 deaths
American football fullbacks
Cal Poly Pomona Broncos football coaches
Cal State Fullerton Titans football coaches
Denver Broncos coaches
New Orleans Saints coaches
Pacific Tigers football coaches
San Diego Chargers coaches
UCLA Bruins football coaches
UNLV Rebels football coaches
UNLV Rebels football players
USC Trojans football coaches
High school football coaches in Nevada
Sports coaches from Los Angeles
People from Monrovia, California
Players of American football from Los Angeles
Coaches of American football from California
African-American coaches of American football
African-American players of American football
20th-century African-American sportspeople
21st-century African-American sportspeople